is a city in Yamanashi Prefecture, Japan. , the city had an estimated population of 29,483 in 12662 households, and a population density of 210 persons per km².

Geography
Nirasaki is located in the northwestern end of the Kofu Basin in Yamanashi Prefecture, bordered to the east by the Minami Alps National Park and the west by the Minami Alps Koma Prefectural Natural Park.

Surrounding municipalities
Yamanashi Prefecture
 Hokuto
 Minami-Alps
 Kai

Climate
The city has a climate characterized by characterized by hot and humid summers, and relatively mild winters (Köppen climate classification Cfa).  The average annual temperature in Nirasaki is 13/0 °C. The average annual rainfall is 1278 mm with September as the wettest month.

Demographics
Per Japanese census data, the population of Nirasaki has remained relatively steady in recent decades.

History
The area around present-day Nirasaki was the ancestral homeland of the Takeda clan, which dominated Kai Province in the Sengoku period. During the Edo period, the area was tenryō territory under the direct administration of the Tokugawa shogunate, and the village of Niirasaki was a post town on the Kōshū Kaidō highway. During the early Meiji period, the area was organized into 14 villages under Kitakoma District, Yamanashi. Nirasaki was elevated to town status on September 20, 1892. Modern Nirasaki City was founded by merger of Nirasaki with ten surrounding villages on October 10, 1954.

Government
Nirasaki has a mayor-council form of government with a directly elected mayor and a unicameral city legislature of 18 members.

Economy
The economy of Nirasaki is primarily agricultural.

Education
Nirasaki has five public elementary schools and two public middle schools operated by the city government and two public high schools operated by the Yamanashi Prefectural Board of Education.

Transportation

Railway
 Central Japan Railway Company - Chūō Main Line
  -  -

Highway
  Chūō Expressway

Sister city relations
 – Fairfield, California, USA
 – Jiamusi, Heilongjiang, China

Local attractions
Site of Shinpu Castle, Takeda Hachiman-gu, Ganjo-ji
Site of Hakusan Castle
Nirasaki Asahi onsen
Nirasaki Ōmura Art Museum

Notable people
Ichizō Kobayashi, industrialist
Azuma Koshiishi, politician
Satoshi Omura, scientist

References

External links

Official Website 

 
Cities in Yamanashi Prefecture